The Carolina Geographic Rugby Union is the Local Area Union (LAU) for rugby union teams playing in North Carolina and South Carolina.  Youth rugby in North Carolina is governed by the North Carolina State Rugby Organization of USARugby, the North Carolina Youth Rugby Union.

Men's Clubs
 hill warriors.org Chapel Hill Warriors Rugby Football Club - NCRU Division II
Bragg Rugby Football Club (based in Fayetteville, North Carolina) - NCRU Division III
Cherry Point Bastards Rugby Football Club - NCRU Division IV
Columbia Olde Grey Rugby Football Club - NCRU Division III
Camp Lejeune Misfits Rugby Football Club - NCRU Division III
 Triad Rugby Football Club - NCRU Division III
 Cape Fear Rugby Football Club - NCRU Division III
 Duke Grads Rugby Football Club
 Gastonia Rugby Football Club - www.GastonCountyRugby.com
 Eno River Rage Rugby Football Club (based in Durham, North Carolina) - NCRU Division III
 Southern Pines Rugby Football Club - NCRU Division II
 Charlotte Barbarians Rugby Football Club  - NCRU Division III
 Charlotte Royals Rugby Football Club
 Wilmington Rugby Football Club "Liberty Ships"
 Asheville Rugby Football Club
 Charlotte Rugby Football Club - www.charlotterugby.com - NCRU Division II
 Raleigh Rugby Football Club - Vipers

Boys High School
 Ardrey Kell High School
 Charlotte Catholic High School RFC 
 Concord High School RFC (DEFUNCT)
 East Mecklenburg High School RFC
 Myers Park High School RFC
 Philip O Berry Academy RFC
 Providence High School RFC
 Rocky River RFC
 William Amos Hough High School
 West Mecklenburg High School RFC

Boy's Club Rugby
 North Mecklenburg High School RFC
 Chapel Hill Highlanders
 Southern Pines Gators
 Clayton Copperheads
 Triad Bulldogs (DEFUNCT)
 Raleigh Rattlesnakes
 Raleigh Redhawks
 Union County Lions
 Charlotte Tigers
 Greensboro Youth Rugby Association

Women's Clubs
 Charlotte Rugby Football Club
 Eno River Rugby Football Club
 Ft. Bragg Women's Rugby Football Club
 Raleigh Rugby Football Club - Venom

Men's Collegiate
 AHO (Appalachian State) RFC
 Belmont Abbey College
 Davidson
 Duke
 East Carolina
 Elon
 Guilford College
 North Carolina State
 UNC - Chapel Hill
 UNC - Charlotte
 UNC - Greensboro
 UNC - Pembroke
 UNC - Wilmington
 Wake Forest
 Western Carolina
 Wingate University

Women's Collegiate
 Appalachian State
 Duke
 East Carolina
 Elon
 Guilford
 North Carolina State
 UNC - Greensboro
 UNC - Chapel Hill
 UNC - Charlotte
 UNC - Wilmington
 Western Carolina

Girl's High School/Club
 East Meck (DEFUNCT)
 North Meck
 Myers Park
 Providence (DEFUNCT)
 South Meck HS
 Southern Pines Youth Rugby Harlequins 
 TAYRA Capitals
 Northern Guildford Nighthawks
 Drop Kick Divas
 Greensboro Youth Rugby Association

References

External links
USA Rugby official site

Rugby union governing bodies in the United States
Rugby union in North Carolina